Andrey Safaryan, (born August 31, 1966) is a Kazakhstani sprint canoer of Armenian descent who competed in the mid-1990s. At the 1996 Summer Olympics in Atlanta, he was eliminated in the repechages of the K-1 1000 m event and the semifinals of the K-4 1000 m event. He was born in Guryev.

External links
Sports-Reference.com profile

1966 births
Living people
People from Atyrau
Soviet male canoeists
Kazakhstani male canoeists
Canoeists at the 1996 Summer Olympics
Olympic canoeists of Kazakhstan
Kazakhstani people of Armenian descent
Soviet Armenians
Ethnic Armenian sportspeople